Rădoaia is a village in Sîngerei District, Moldova.

Notable people
 Ștefan Pirogan

References

Villages of Sîngerei District